Urdorf Weihermatt is a railway station in the municipality of Urdorf, in the Swiss canton of Zurich. The station is located on the Zurich to Zug via Affoltern am Albis railway line.

Service 
The station is served by Zurich S-Bahn lines S5 and S14. During weekends, there is also a nighttime S-Bahn service (SN5) offered by ZVV.

Summary of S-Bahn services:

 Zürich S-Bahn:
 Nighttime S-Bahn (only during weekends):

References 

Railway stations in the canton of Zürich
Swiss Federal Railways stations
Railway stations in Switzerland opened in 1990